Menna Elfyn  FLSW (born 1952) is a Welsh poet, playwright, columnist, and editor who writes in Welsh. She has been widely commended and translated. She was imprisoned for her campaigning as a Welsh-language activist.

Background
During the 1970s and 1980s, Menna Elfyn was a member and sometime official of Cymdeithas yr Iaith Gymraeg. She was twice imprisoned for acts of civil disobedience. She described the ordeal of being forced to speak in the English language to her parents when they visited her in prison.

Elfyn has published ten volumes of poetry and a dozen more of children's books and anthologies. She has also written eight plays for the stage, six radio plays for the BBC, and two plays and several documentaries for television. She co-edited The Bloodaxe Book of Modern Welsh Poetry with John Rowlands, which won a Poetry Book Society recommendation. She has won numerous prizes for her work, including a Creative Arts prize to write a book on sleep (Cwsg: am dro yn ôl).

When Elfyn issued her bilingual selected poems Eucalyptus, (Gwasg Gomer, 1995), Tony Conran described her as "the first Welsh poet in 1500 years to have her work known outside Wales." He gave similar praise to her second bilingual volume, Cell Angel (1996).

Her work has been translated into 18 languages, including Italian, Spanish, Portuguese, and Lithuanian. She was Writing Director of the Masters Programme in Creative Writing at Trinity University College, Carmarthen, and a Literary Fellow at Swansea University.

Elfyn lives in Llandysul. Her daughter, Fflur Dafydd, is a writer and musician.

Published works

Poetry
Mwyara, Gwasg Gomer (1976) , 
Stafelloedd Aros, Gwasg Gomer (1978) , 
Tro’r Haul Arno, Gwasg Gomer (1981) , 
Mynd Lawr i’r Nefoedd, Gwasg Gomer (1985) , 
Aderyn Bach Mewn Llaw: cerddi 1976–90, Gwasg Gomer (1990) , 
Eucalyptus, Gwasg Gomer (1995) 
Cell Angel, Bloodaxe Books (1996)
Cusan Dyn Dall/ Blind Man's Kiss, Bloodaxe Books (2001)
Perffaith Nam, Gwasg Gomer (2005) , 
Perffaith Nam. Perfect Blemish, Bloodaxe Books (2007) , 
Er dy fod , Gwasg Gomer 2007 (book for learners/learning a language)
Merch Perygl: Cerddi 1976-2011 (Gomer Press, 2011)
Murmur (Bloodaxe, 2012)
Bondo (Bloodaxe, 2017)
 Edited, with John Rowlands: The Bloodaxe Book of Modern Welsh Poetry (Bloodaxe, 2003)

Prose
Optimist Absoliwt: Cofiant Eluned Phillips (biography of Eluned Phillips) (Gomer Press, 2016)
Cwsg: am dro yn ôl (illustrated by Sarah Williams) (Gomer Press, 2019)

Other works
Red Lady of Paviland A project with composer Andrew Powell, Musical Director Craig Roberts and the Burry Port Town Band, the centrepiece of which will be Menna and Andrew's new work 'Y Dyn Unig' (The Lonely Man).
Menna Elfyn (ed.) Cyfrinachau by Eluned Phillips (Honno, 2021)

Awards
Major Prize for Volume of Poetry (Stafelloedd Aros), Wrexham National Eisteddfod. (1977)
Member of the Gorsedd for contribution to Welsh Literature. (1995)
Poet Laureate for the Children of Wales (2002)
Creative Wales Award (2008)
Anima Istranza Foreign Prize for Poetry (2009)
Arts Council Prize for 'Aderyn Bach mewn Llaw' 
Longlisted for book of the year, ' Cusan Dyn Dall/ Blind Man's Kiss 

Menna Elfyn became a Fellow of the Royal Society of Literature in 2015.

References

External links
Menna Elfyn Website
Menna Elfyn Profile at BBC Wales
Menna Elfyn Profile at British Council
Menna Elfyn Profile at Bloodaxe Books

1951 births
20th-century Welsh dramatists and playwrights
21st-century British dramatists and playwrights
20th-century Welsh poets
21st-century Welsh poets
20th-century Welsh women writers
21st-century Welsh women writers
21st-century Welsh writers
Fellows of the Royal Society of Literature
Living people
Welsh women poets
Welsh language activists
Welsh-language poets
Welsh children's writers
British women children's writers
Welsh women dramatists and playwrights
People associated with Trinity University College
People associated with Swansea University
Welsh prisoners and detainees
Welsh book editors
Welsh women editors
People from Ceredigion